Khatyari is a Census Town in the Indian state of Uttarakhand located near Almora.

References

Villages in Almora district